Coras lamellosus is a species of funnel weaver in the family of spiders known as Agelenidae. It is found in the United States.

References

External links

 

Agelenidae
Articles created by Qbugbot
Spiders described in 1887